The Berencross is a cyclo-cross race held in Meulebeke, Belgium, which is part of the Ethias Cross, formerly known as the Brico Cross.

Past winners

References
 Men's results
 Women's results

Cycle races in Belgium
Cyclo-cross races
Recurring sporting events established in 2016
2016 establishments in Belgium